Needham is an unincorporated town in Needham Township, Johnson County, Indiana.

History
Needham was platted in 1866 by Noah Needham.

The post office was established as Needhams Station. The Needhams Station post office opened in 1866, and was officially renamed Needham in 1882.

References

Unincorporated communities in Johnson County, Indiana
Unincorporated communities in Indiana
Indianapolis metropolitan area